NNC can stand for:
Naga National Council, a predecessor of the Nationalist Socialist Council of Nagaland (NSCN)
Natal Native Contingent, British auxiliary soldiers in South Africa around late 19th century 
National Nanotechnology Competition, of Iran
National Nutrition Council (Philippines)
National Negro Congress, Black liberation organisation in the United States 
National Nuclear Center, of the Republic of  Kazakhstan
National Nuclear Corporation (later officially just NNC), a company formed by the merger of companies that built the UK's nuclear power stations; bought by AMEC in 2005
National Numismatic Collection, a part of the National Museum of American History
neonatal care
neonatal cholestasis
neonatal conjunctivitis
neonatal cutting
Nepal Nursing Council
Nobel Night Cap, the student festivity at the end of the Nobel Prize week
North Northamptonshire Council, England 
 Northwest Nazarene College, now called Northwest Nazarene University, Idaho, United States 
Norwegian Nobel Committee